Trash was a popular London indie and electro nightclub run by Erol Alkan.

The club was held weekly on Monday night. The first night was in January 1997, while the last was 10 years later in January 2007. It first existed at the original Plastic People in Soho, then at neighbouring venue The Annexe on Dean Street, before finally finding a home at The End off New Oxford Street in the West End of London.

It was influential in terms of pioneering and popularising new genres of music, such as the garage rock revival and electroclash, with early performances from bands such as the Yeah Yeah Yeahs, LCD Soundsystem, Bloc Party, and Klaxons.

DJs

In its formative years at Plastic People and The Annexe, Trash's DJs were Erol Alkan and James. When the club moved and expanded to The End they were initially joined by Rory Phillips and in the years that followed, Mavs and The Lovely Jonjo.

Songs

For the latter 5 years of the club, the last two tracks played were always the same. "There Is a Light That Never Goes Out" by The Smiths and then "Rock 'n' Roll Suicide" by David Bowie.  Erol Alkan believed "they are the two songs that best reflect club culture, its people and places, highs and lows and bring people together".

The last ever track played was "Dancing Queen" by ABBA.

External links

Article on its influence from The Guardian
Photos from the last night
DJ Mixes from Trash
Videos from Trash

References

Nightclubs in London
Garage punk
Music venues completed in 1997
1997 establishments in England
2007 disestablishments in England